Seetha Vallabha  is an Indian Kannada language television drama that premiered on Colors Kannada on 18 June 2018. It came into the foray due some remarkable performances by the lead pair. Telecast of serial began in Colors Kannada channel and remains the same till date. The show ended in August 2020, after airing successfully for two years. The show was dubbed in Hindi as Dil Ka Rishta on Colors Rishtey UK from 2 September 2019 - 2 December 2021 and in Odia on Colors Odia as Ehi Milana Juga Jugara.

Plot 
Acchu, the son of a rich business tycoon, falls in love with Gubbi, an orphan. However, they have to fight the societal norms and expectations to stay together. But much changes after they marry.

Cast 
 Akarsh Bairamudi / Jaganath Chandrashekhar  as Acchu alias Arya 
 Supritha Sathyanarayana  as Gubbi alias Mythili
 Chanadana Mahalingaiha as Ankitha
 Vanishree  as Devaki
 Hema V.Belur
 Darsh Chandrappa

References 

2018 Indian television series debuts
2020 Indian television series endings
Kannada-language television shows
Colors Kannada original programming